Nimapada (also spelt as Nimapara) is a town and a Notified Area Council (NAC) in Puri district on the way to Konark and 40 km from the state capital Bhubaneswar in the Indian state of Odisha.

Geography

Demographics
 India census, Nimapada had a population of 16,914. Males constitute 52% of the population and females 48%. Nimapada has an average literacy rate of 77%, higher than the national average of 59.5%: male literacy is 82%, and female literacy is 72%. In Nimapada, 10% of the population is under 6 years of age.

Politics
Current MLA from Nimapara (Gen) Assembly Constituency is Mr. Sameer Ranjan Dash(Bhaina) BJD, who won the seat in State elections in 2009,2014,2019 with a big margin, against pravati parida(apa) of bjp. Previous MLAs from this seat were Baidhar Mallick of BJP on 2000 and 2004, Rabindra Kumar Sethy of INC in 1995 and 1985 and 1980 (in 1980, he represented INC(I)), Benudhara Sethy of BJD in 1990, Govind Chandra Sethi of JNP in 1977.

Nimapara is part of Jagatsinghpur (Lok Sabha constituency).

References

Cities and towns in Puri district